Uribe may refer to:

Places
Uribe, a historical subdivision of Biscay (Basque Country), in Spain
Hego Uribe
Uribe-Kosta
Rafael Uribe Uribe (Bogotá), city district in Colombia.
La Uribe, department of Meta, in Colombia.

Surname
Uribe (surname)

Other
Uribe class patrol vessel, offshore patrol vessels use by the Mexican Navy

ca:Uribe
eu:Uribe